Christine Wachtel (born 6 January 1965) is a German track and field athlete who won the silver medal for East Germany at the 1988 Olympic summer games in Seoul in the 800 metres run.  Her time of 1:56.64 put her second to her training partner Sigrun Wodars.

Wachtel was born in Altentreptow, Mecklenburg-Vorpommern

Her earlier successes in the 800 meter run included:
 1983: Second at the Junior European championship (2:00.42 Min.)
 1987: Second at the World championship (1:55.32 Min.)

In 1990, she was second at the European championships. (1:56.11 Min.)

Other success in the 4 × 400 meter relay:
 1991: Third at the world championship with the German 4 × 400 meter relay (3:21.25 Min.).

She also participated in the 1992 Olympic summer games in Barcelona, where she was, however, eliminated in the 800 meter preliminaries.

Wachtel trained at the Neubrandenburg sport club under trainer Walter Gladrow.  During her career she was 1.66 meters tall and weighed 66 kilograms.  After her sport career she operates a pizza-bakery in Neubrandenburg.

External links
 

1965 births
Living people
People from Altentreptow
People from Bezirk Neubrandenburg
East German female middle-distance runners
Sportspeople from Mecklenburg-Western Pomerania
Olympic athletes of East Germany
Olympic athletes of Germany
World Athletics Championships athletes for East Germany
World Athletics Championships athletes for Germany
Athletes (track and field) at the 1988 Summer Olympics
Athletes (track and field) at the 1992 Summer Olympics
World Athletics Championships medalists
European Athletics Championships medalists
Medalists at the 1988 Summer Olympics
Olympic silver medalists for East Germany
Olympic silver medalists in athletics (track and field)
Recipients of the Patriotic Order of Merit in silver
World Athletics Indoor Championships winners